Podivín is a town in Břeclav District in the South Moravian Region of the Czech Republic. It has about 3,000 inhabitants.

Notable people
Vit Klemes (1932–2010), Czech-Canadian hydrologist
Jan Kostrhun (1942–2022), politician

References

External links

Cities and towns in the Czech Republic
Populated places in Břeclav District